Volodymyr Oleksiyovych Kudryavtsev (Ukrainian: Володимир Олексійович Кудрявцев, 7 October 1934 - 30 April 2014) in the village of Sinelnykove, in the Dnipropetrovsk region) was one of the most popular Ukrainian lyricists of the 1970s and 1980s.

Overall, Volodymyr Kudryavtsev authored approximately 700 lyrics and poems, most of which still remain unknown to the public. Throughout his career he teamed up with many famous composers, among them were O. Zuev, I. Shamo, O. Bilash, M. Mozgovy,  O. Semenova,  E. Martynov, V. Ivasyuk. His major hit “Stozhary” was created in collaboration with composer and singer Pavlo Dvorsky. Other well-known songs included “A My u Dvoh,” “Zapytay u Serdsya,” “Shovkova Kosytsya,” “Povir Ocham,” “Sche ne Vechir.” Volodymyr's songs were performed by Nazariy Yaremchuk, Vasyl Zinkevych, Sofia Rotaru, Liliya Sandulesa, Lina Prohorova, Radmila Karaklajich, Evgen Martynov, Viktor Shportko, Ala Kudlay, Nadiya Chepraga, as well as then-popular Ukrainian bands, such as, “Kobza,” “Vodogray,”“Charivni gitaru,” “Plamjya”, and “Kalyna.”
  
The achievements of Volodymyr Kudryavtsev have been recognized by the Ukrainian Government: he was awarded the title of “Recognized Artist of Ukraine” as well as a Presidential Honorary Certificate “For his personal contribution to the development of the Ukrainian state and strengthening of its independence.”

Career

In the mid-1950s Kudryavtsev managed a culture club in the town of Shakhty (Rostov region). At the same time he took singing and accordion lessons in the Rostov Art School. When he moved to Kyshenev (Moldova), he acted in various capacities: hosted concerts, lectured, wrote scripts for the stage and even thought about writing a musical. He also worked as a part-time actor.

In the beginning of the 60s, he worked on the Dnieper Hydroelectric Station, where he met Les Tanyuk and Vyacheslav Chornovil. Soon after that, he moved to the capital of Ukraine, Kyiv. There he found work at the Dovzhenko Film Studios as a voice actor; at the same time he started teaching in the Kyiv Culture School; however, he was dismissed shortly thereafter in connection with anti-Soviet propaganda.
 
In the mid-sixties, Volodymyr became a club director of one of the polytechnical schools in Kyiv. In 1968, he formed a band called “Interina,” which was made up of foreign students studying in the capital. The uniqueness of the repertoire was that it consisted mainly of Ukrainian songs. Under Volodymyr's guidance the band won the National Contest of Young Performers.

In the early 70s, Volodymyr took on responsibilities of the editor of music programs on the Ukrainian Radio. Concurrently, he was studying by correspondence at the Institute of Culture in St. Petersburg (formerly Leningrad). He penned a good number of poems and songs during this period.

The collaboration with a young composer and singer Evgen Martynov was very promising. Once, strolling along the scenic bank of the Dnieper river, Volodymyr asked: “Why don’t we write a song in Ukrainian and you perform it?” And so the new song was born, “Kolyory Kohannya.” The friends planned a lot of other interesting projects; however, they didn't come true because of Martynov's sudden death.

In 1979, Kudryavtsev partnered with Pavlo Dvorsky. At that time Pavlo was the lead singer of the band “Smerichka” and had just started his career as a composer. Together they wrote the song “Stozhary.” Its performance by Nazariy Yaremchuk became a hit in Ukraine.

Partnerships with such authors as Pavlo Dvorsky, Olexander Zuev, Borys Monastyrsky, Olexander Bilash, Igor Shamo, Mykola Mozgovy, Olexiy Semenov, Volodymyr Yartsev, Volodymyr Ivasyuk, Levko Dutkovsky, Stepan Sabadash, Ivan Golyak resulted in hits. Volodymyr's songs were performed on Ukrainian radio and TV by Nazariy Yaremchuk, Vasyl Zinkevych, Sofia Rotaru, Lilya Sandulesa, Lina Prohorova, Tamara Miansarova, Radmila Karaklayich, Evgen Martynov, Ala Kudlay, Nadiya Chepraga, Viktor Shportko, as well as by then-famous Ukrainian bands, such as, “Kobza,” “Vodogray,”“Charivni Gitary,” “Plamjya”,“Kalyna.”

The period from the late 80s to mid-90s was filled with new projects and political activism. Thus, when a wave of national consciousness for independence swept through Ukraine, Volodymyr joined the "RUH" political movement. Later, when Volodymyr lived in Crimea, he was fascinated by the idea of creating a memorial complex called "Montedor." The future museum was supposed to tell about the activities of prominent art figures of Ukraine and other countries during their stay in Crimea. He had already found many interesting materials about Lesya Ukrayinka, Adam Mickiewicz, Alexander Pushkin and Vasily Zhukovsky. The idea was supported by Kyiv officials; however, due to insufficient funding the work was discontinued. In the 90s, Volodymyr collaborated with the Black Sea band ensemble, wrote lyrics, poems and essays. The local media, in particular “The Patriot of the Fatherland,” frequently made references to his work.

The artistic career of Volodymyr Kudryavtsev was badly affected by a series of misfortunes and family dramas that started to creep into his life, impacting his health and leading to drinking problems. In 2000 he became practically broke. Thanks to the help of his friends the poet found a home at the Natalya Uzhviy House of Veterans of Stage, in Kyiv, where he lived for the last 6 years of his life.

Media has also expressed interest in his hardships and published a few controversial articles, some of which, however, were not based on verified facts.  Volodymyr Kudryavtsev had also appeared a few times on TV shows (“Life after Glory,” “Interviews with Dvorsky”). His songs were again performed by modern Ukrainian artists, such as, Taisiya Povaliy, Mariya Yaremchuk, Viktor Pavlik, and others. The hit “A My u Dvoh” was revitalized into a video clip with a humorous plot, performed by Valeriy Leontyev and Viktor Gordon.

The last years of his life were devoted mostly to the restoration of the poems created during his lifetime. Unfortunately, this project remains unfinished...

Personal life

Volodymyr Kudryavtsev met his first wife Raisa in Sakhalin, where he served in the Army. They got married in 1956 and moved to the town of Shakhty (Rostov region). In 1957 they had a daughter, Natalia. A few years after, their marriage ended. Volodymyr met Halyna, who lived in Kyshenev (Moldova), and moved in with her. In 1961, the couple had a daughter, Lyudmila; however, the second marriage didn't last long either.

His mother, Hanna Denisovna, had always been his mainstay and even supported him financially, whenever he was in dire straits.  She wanted to see more stability in her son's personal life. In 1962, she invited Natalia to Kyiv and helped to raise her.

In 1964, Volodymyr met his third wife, Valerbina. After a few days of dating they got married and settled down in Kyiv. In 1966, the couple had a daughter, Lesya.  Natalia and Lesya grew up together; their grandmother, Hanna Denisovna, spent a lot of time with the girls. Volodymyr also tried to contribute more time to the family, but due to the chaotic pace of his lifestyle his relationship with Valerbina didn't work out and they divorced in 1970.

During his visits to St. Petersburg (formerly Leningrad), Volodymyr was romantically linked to singer Tamara Miansarova. The intense touring schedule of the singer stood in the way of a more stable relationship. In 1971, Volodymyr got married for the fourth time, to Tamara, who soon died due to a serious illness. He started getting into the habit of drinking. In 1973, he fell off the balcony and ended up in a hospital. After multiple operations, he could walk again, but had to wear an orthopedic corset for a long time. In 1977, he brought his daughter Lyudmila from Kyshenev to Kyiv and she stayed with him for a few years.

Living in a certain environment, Volodymyr couldn't resist the temptations of show business and was involved in romantic relationships with many women. During his stay in Italy he met Diana Liberatori, with whom he had a son, Voldemar. Their relationship ended after he returned to Kyiv. Many years after, he tried to find Diana and Voldemar, but to no avail.

1979 was a really disastrous year in the poet's life. Natalia's daughter, the little Hannusya, tragically died. This event affected Volodymyr very much, and continued to haunt him for the rest of his life. His mother, Hanna Denisovna, couldn't cope with the tragedy and died two weeks after. 
 
Little by little he came back to senses. In 1981 Volodymyr married Inna. In 1982, the couple moved to Yalta (Crimea) and rented rooms in a mansion formerly belonging to a Count, which was located on the territory of the Nikitsky Botanical Gardens. It was here that Inna had the idea of researching the mansion's history, which in turn led to the start of the “Montedor” project.

His last marriage was with Oksana, whom he married in 1986. They lived in Yalta and stayed together for approximately 11 years. After the divorce, he lost his rights to the real estate they had together.

On his way back to Kyiv, he lost his passport, and due to some unfavorable circumstances he lost his property in Kyiv as well. His daughter Natalia tried to help to restore his rights but it didn't work out. Volodymyr became addicted to alcohol. This was another difficult period in his life, and it took a tremendous toll on his health and career. He checked into a hospital, where he met his former friend, Dr. Ivan Kharchuk. He and Les Tanyuk helped Volodymyr to get lodging at the Natalya Uzhviy House of Veterans of Stage in Kyiv.

Broke, disappointed and in despair, the poet attempted to commit suicide; however, his new friend, Mykola Oleynchuk, the former actor of the Uzhgorod Drama Theatre, saved him. They became close friends. His old friends, Pavlo Dvorsky, Yuriy Rozhkov, and others came to visit and support him as well. The daughters also reconnected with their father and reconciled.

During the last year of his life Volodymyr was sick with cancer.

References

1934 births
2014 deaths
Ukrainian writers
Ukrainian lyricists
Ukrainian male poets
People from Synelnykove
Deaths from cancer in Ukraine